Zhang Chao was a Chinese literatus, publisher, and fiction writer from Anhui Province, China. He was born in 1650 during the Qing dynasty. Zhang had extensive knowledge in the field of Confucianism, Taoism and Buddhism. He liked chess, calligraphy and painting and was good at various kinds of poetry. He was also interested in flowers, birds, fishes and insects. His works are rich in imagination and associated with the features of the Qing dynasty. Shadows of Sweet Dreams and New Tales of Yu Chu are his representative works. He also wrote Huaying ci 花影詞 (Poems of Flower Shadows), Xinang cunjin 奚囊寸錦, and Yin zhong baxian ling 飲中八仙令.

Life
Zhang Chao was born in 1650 in She County, Anhui. One year before he was born, his father Zhang Xikong became a jinshi and went to work in Shandong as an educational inspector. After only a few months, Zhang Xikong's mother died and he resigned his position to go home as a merchant. Zhang Chao grew up in a wealthy family and his education was very strict. Under his father's influence, Zhang Chao studied diligently from his childhood. He devoted himself to the imperial examination for some time and he started to write eight-legged essays when he was 13 years old. Between the ages of 12 and 26, he failed the imperial examinations four times, in 1663, 1666, 1669 and 1672 during the reign of the Kangxi Emperor. He worked as a bureaucrat in the early Kangxi era, but his rank was low and he became disillusioned.

Disappointed with his career, he traveled to many places and lived in Rugao and Yangzhou for long periods. When he finished Shadows of Sweet Dreams, almost a hundred of his friends made comments about his book.

In 1699, he fell victim to a conspiracy and he was sent to prison.

In 1707, he compiled Xinang cunjin. From that point, there is no further information on him and no reliable research in terms of the date of his death. He was familiar with writer , and spoke highly of him. In 1711, Dai Mingshi was sent to prison, where he was killed, an affair that entangled many others. If Zhang Chao was still alive, he would certainly have been involved in that case, so it is inferred that he was no longer alive by 1711.

Major works

Shadows of Sweet Dreams

In 1936, Zhang Yiping, a litterateur, managed to purchase a manuscript of Shadows of Sweet Dreams, which was read by Lin Yutang, who thought highly of it. Lin Yutang translated it into vernacular Chinese and English. Lin Yutang classified the content into six parts: human life, personal character, women and friends, nature, the house and home, reading and literature. The book reflected Zhang Chao's sympathies with the Ming dynasty, and in style was highly reminiscent of Ming-era literature.

New Tales of Yu Chu

This is a collection of early Qing dynasty's stories compiled by Zhang Chao, containing 20 chapters. Yu Chu was the name of an alchemist in the Han dynasty, who was called the earliest ancestor of novelists, and his name was used to indicate certain classical Chinese stories. The historian Ban Gu classified texts associated with Yu Chu under the umbrella term "minor discourses" (xiaoshuo). The editors of the Siku Quanshu regarded the appearance of New Tales of Yu Chu as marking the popularity of weird fiction.

Philology
In addition to novels and essays, Zhang Chao also made contributions to philology. Zhang Chao enjoyed collecting books from all over the empire and enjoyed editing and carving books very much. When he was editing, he made philological comments on the books he referred to and explored their origin and development.

Zhang Chao was one of the scholars who accepted western learning relatively early. He was very interested in western people and language. Moreover, he took advantage of western learning to study Chinese culture. He held the view that western medicine, law, and astronomy should be introduced to China.

References

External links

 
 

1650 births
18th-century deaths

Year of death unknown
People from Huangshan
Qing dynasty novelists
Qing dynasty poets
Writers from Anhui
Poets from Anhui
Chinese male novelists